Alhurra ("the Free One") is a United States-based public Arabic-language satellite TV channel that broadcasts news and current affairs programming to audiences in the Middle East and North Africa. Alhurra is funded by the U.S government and is barred from broadcasting within the United States itself under the 1948 Smith-Mundt Act.

Its stated mission is to provide "objective, accurate and relevant news and information" to its audience while seeking to "support democratic values" and "expand the spectrum of ideas, opinions, and perspectives" available in the region's media. The network has also tried to distinguish itself from its numerous regional competitors by providing access to more in-depth coverage of U.S. issues and policies and coverage of a broader range of opinions and perspectives than normally heard on other Arab television networks.

Alhurra began broadcasting on 14 February 2004 to 22 countries across the Middle East and North Africa. It has established itself as the third highest-rated pan-Arab news channel, surpassing viewership ratings for the BBC (English and Arabic), France 24 Arabic, RT Arabic, CCTV, CNNi, and Sky Arabia. 

In April 2004, an additional channel called Alhurra-Iraq was launched, featuring most of the Alhurra content, with additional programming specifically directed at the Iraqi audience. It is also broadcast on satellite and is available on terrestrial antennas throughout Iraq, including in Basra, and Baghdad. Alhurra-Iraq consistently achieves higher ratings in Iraq than both Al Jazeera and Al Arabiya.

History

The decision to launch Alhurra was prompted by frustration among U.S. government officials over perceived anti-American bias among the leading Arab television networks and the effect these channels were having on Arab public opinion regarding the U.S. Alhurra was intended to serve as an alternative to these channels by presenting the news in a more "balanced and objective" manner in an effort to improve the image of the United States in the Arab world.

The driving force behind the launch of Alhurra was Norman Pattiz, a media executive and founder and chairman of broadcast industry giant Westwood One. While serving as a member of the Broadcasting Board of Governors (BBG), currently the U.S. Agency for Global Media (USAGM), the U.S. federal agency that controls all foreign non-military radio and TV broadcasts, Pattiz advocated strongly for the creation of a U.S.-funded television network specifically directed at Arab audiences. Pattiz had also previously been responsible for the creation of Radio Sawa, a USAGM-administered Arabic-language radio network which broadcast a mix of music, entertainment, and news. The idea to launch Alhurra stemmed from the success that Radio Sawa had exhibited in reaching young audiences in the Middle East.

Pattiz believed that Arab audiences' views of the United States were being negatively influenced by existing Arab news networks' focus on coverage of the wars in Iraq, Afghanistan, and the Israeli–Palestinian conflict. He argued that by presenting a wider range of perspectives on these conflicts and other U.S. policies, as well as a coverage of a broader variety of regional and global issues of interest to Arab audiences, a U.S.-funded satellite TV channel could help improve America's image in the region.

In an appearance on CBS's 60 Minutes in May 2004, Pattiz described a powerful promotional video he helped produce which led to the successful launch of Alhurra:

"We showed the negative images that people get of the United States on Middle Eastern television," says Pattiz. "There was lots of anti-U.S. demonstrations—burning the president in effigy, stomping on the American flag. We then said, 'And this is what you see from America.' And we had about 4 seconds of black screen."

As a result of Pattiz's efforts, the Bush administration requested funding for the channel from Congress, and obtained $62 million in funding for its first year of operation (including start-up costs). In the fall of 2003, construction began to renovate an old TV channel building in Springfield, VA into a modern broadcast facility for the new channel. Construction was completed less than six months later, and Alhurra's first broadcast aired 14 February 2004.

Organization and funding

The MBN is a non-profit organization financed through a grant from the U.S. Agency for Global Media (USAGM), formerly the Broadcasting Board of Governors (BBG), an independent federal agency funded by the U.S. Congress.  The U.S. Agency for Global Media oversees all U.S. public broadcasting outlets and is intended to act as a firewall to protect the editorial independence and professional integrity of the broadcasters.

Alhurra's headquarters are in Springfield, Virginia.  The network also maintains bureaus in Baghdad and Dubai, production centers in Beirut, Jerusalem, Cairo, Rabat, Erbil and Washington, D.C., as well as correspondents throughout the Middle East, North Africa, the United States and Europe.

Awards
In 2019, Alhurra's report Power of Forgiveness won the People's Voice Award in the category of Best Documentary.

In 2016, Alhurra Television's documentary series "Delusional Paradise" won the Silver Award at the Cannes Corporate Media & TV Awards. And the promotional video for the "Delusional Paradise" won a bronze medal at the New York Festivals International Television & Film Awards.

In 2014, three Alhurra shows won the Special Jury Award at the CINE Golden Eagle Awards. Street Pulse, Where are We Going and a promotional clip for the project Syrian Stories, have won prizes in 2014.

Street Pulse won the prize of the best documentary in the Middle East for the year 2013, especially for the episode the Tragedy of Quarry Workers in Minya.

Programming 

Alhurra broadcasts 24 hours a day and, like other USAGM-run broadcasters, is commercial-free. In addition to reporting regional and international news, the channel provides information on a variety of subjects, including the rights of women, human rights, religious freedom, freedom of expression, health, entertainment news, sports, and science and technology. The network supplements its original programming with broadcasts of Arabic-subtitled versions of English-language programs familiar to U.S. (and global) audiences, such as PBS's Frontline and NOVA, A&E's Biography and Modern Marvels. In addition, the network reversions and repackages prominent American news and news magazine series, such as the PBS Newshour and CBS’ 60 Minutes into its own Arabic-language feature news programs.

Alhurra has over the years hosted a number of prominent politicians, journalists and intellectuals in one-on-one long format interviews. Guests have included many heads of state, Supreme Court justices, foreign ministers, national security advisers, secretaries of state, education, commerce and many White House Officials from both parties.  Many journalists have appeared on Alhurra including Tom Friedman, David Brooks, and other prominent politicos such as Mary Matalin, Jalal Talabani, Paul Volcker, John Bolton, Terry McAuliffe, Joe Lieberman, Susan Turnbull, Robert Zimmerman, Steve Murphy, David Corn, Peter Fenn, Michael Steele, Tony Coehlo, Alon Ben-Meir, and Eleanor Clift.

Notable programs 
 Al Youm ("Today") – The two-hour program provides viewers a window to the world through its coverage of the latest news from the Middle East, the U.S. and the world; as well as topics such as health, entertainment news, sports, technology, social and cultural issues. Al Youm tackles current affairs in a relaxed, engaging environment. The program also includes interviews with everyone from politicians to athletes; leaders in business and the arts. The show is presented by Egyptian Anchor Bassel Sabri, along with Leen AlBudeiri from Palestine and Raghda Ibrahim from Libya.
 The Talk Is Syrian – A weekly show that analyzes, through discussion and visual elements, the developments, human crises, and overall political situation in Syria.
 Decision's Capital – A weekly show that displays American foreign policy with insiders who shape and influence the policies.
 Islam Hurr ("Free Islam") – A weekly show hosted by respected Islamic scholar Islam Bheiry, focuses on the interpretation of Islam and looking at the positives that can come from religion.
 Forbidden – A weekly show hosted by Lebanese writer and activist Joumana Haddad, highlights the artistic and literary works of controversial voices that have been suppressed in the Middle East. Over the years, many views have been censored for delving into topics that are considered taboo in the region such as government corruption, political and social oppression, religion and social issues. This weekly show provides a platform for silenced intellectual moderate voices and ideas whose work is banned or marginalized in Arab countries.
 Investigative Reports – A weekly no-holds barred show that highlights and encapsulates the best of original, Alhurra investigative reports produced by Alhurra’s new investigative news unit.
 Defecting Back Home – A limited run series that explores life after ISIS from the point of view of ex-ISIS fighters who address how they joined ISIS, what they saw and did, why they left, and how they are coming back to life.
 Sam and Ammar – A weekly show where two intellectuals share their unfiltered and cutting edge views of current affairs and spotlight Washington’s political and economic decisions that impact the target region.
 Debatable – A weekly show wherein the renowned Ibrahim Essa promotes critical thinking while analyzing radical Islamic ideas and raises questions on how these ideas are dictating lives and risk essential freedom.
 Gulf Talk – A weekly talk show that examines the most important political, social and educational issues facing the Gulf. The program tackles controversial topics and goes beyond the headlines to discuss the impact that different issues have on the region..
 Inside Washington – A weekly American current affairs program that addresses political and social issues.
 Extremism – Stories of people who defected from ISIS, and how they're trying to cope with their past actions while being back to their homes and families.

Viewership 
Alhurra competes with more than 550 Arabic-language satellite TV channels for its audience in the Middle East, and as a result Alhurra initially struggled after its launch in 2004 to attract viewers in the already-crowded Arab media market. Annual surveys commissioned by the USAGM showed that Alhurra's weekly audience grew by 28% between 2004 and 2008, surpassing 25 million. Recent surveys by international research organizations including ACNielsen show that Alhurra has consistently averaged approximately 26 million weekly viewers in its broadcast region from 2009 to 2011. While this number is dwarfed by the overall viewership of Qatar-funded channel Al Jazeera and Saudi Arabia-funded Al Arabiya, it is nevertheless greater than the viewership of all other non-indigenous Arabic-language news networks (including CNN Arabic, BBC Arabic and France24's Arabic-language channel) combined. A USAGM-commissioned poll in February 2011 found that 25% of Egyptians living in Cairo and Alexandria tuned into Alhurra during the protests in that country in January 2011, surpassing Al Jazeera's 22% viewership during the same period.

Although not a traditional viewership survey, University of Maryland/Zogby polls of several Arab nations (Jordan, Lebanon, Morocco, Saudi Arabia, and the UAE) asked which channels viewers tuned into most often. Just 2% overall stated that Alhurra was the channel they turned to most often in 2008, and that number dropped to 1% in 2009 (this poll added Egyptian respondents).

However, the channel's popularity has shown some signs of improvement in recent years, particularly in Iraq, which has proven to be Alhurra's most successful market in the Arab world. A 2005 Ipsos poll found that just 14% of Iraqi respondents tuned into Alhurra (ranking 11th place). However, a 2008 Ipsos poll of Iraqi viewers found the network's popularity had increased to 18%, overtaking Al Jazeera (15%). This improvement could be due to Alhurra's launch of Alhurra-Iraq, an Iraq-focused channel with programming tailored especially to the Iraqi audience. In its FY2010 budget submission, the U.S. Agency for Global Media (USAGM), formerly the Broadcasting Board of Governors (BBG), noted that the channel's viewership had improved to 5th place in the Iraqi market.

Threats to journalists
Alhurra journalists and correspondents have frequently faced threats, intimidation, and violence from both government and non-state actors opposed to their coverage.

Some notable incidents include:
 In August 2012, Syrian authorities reportedly injured and detained Alhurra reporter, Bashar Fahmy.
 In June 2011, Yemeni authorities attacked an Alhurra reporter and photographer who were covering a sit-in taking place in front of the Vice President's house in Sana'a.
 In March 2011, Alhurra reporter Abdel Karim Al-Shaibani was assaulted and beaten by unknown assailants on a street in Sana'a, Yemen.
 In February 2011, Alhurra's Cairo bureau was targeted during the unrest in Egypt. Unknown armed men stormed its offices and "threatened to kill Al-Hurra's two on-air journalists—Akram Khuzam and Tarek El Shamy—if they didn't leave the building."
 Beginning 2 February 2011, Alhurra's satellite signal was jammed for nearly a month by Libyan authorities in response to coverage of anti-government protests in the country.
 In October 2010, Tahrir Kadhim Jawad, a freelance journalist and contributor to Alhurra, was killed when a bomb attached to his car exploded in Garma, Iraq, west of Baghdad in Al Anbar Governorate.
 In May 2010, Mauritanian police beat several journalists and briefly detained Hachem Sidi Salem, a local correspondent for the satellite television channel Alhurra, for covering a strike by members of the National Bar Association.
 In October 2008, Alhurra TV correspondent Saad Qusay was forced to request around-the-clock police protection at his home in Basra after being threatened by a militant group. The authorities subsequently advised Qusay to leave the country temporarily as an additional safety measure.
 In April 2008, Iraqi cameraman Mazin al-Tayar was shot in the leg as he filmed a military operation in Hayaniyah for Alhurra.
 In December 2006, Unidentified gunmen shot and wounded Omar Mohammad, an Alhurra correspondent, in Baghdad's central Bab al-Sharqi area.
 In February 2005, Iraqi Alhurra correspondent Abdul-Hussein Khazal and his three-year-old son were shot dead by unknown gunmen in Basra.

Historical controversies

Allegations of pro-American bias 
The fact that Alhurra is funded by the U.S. Congress through the U.S. Agency for Global Media (USAGM), formerly the Broadcasting Board of Governors (BBG), has led some critics to claim that the channel is "state propaganda" and presents its news with a pro-American bias. Alhurra has openly tried to distinguish itself from the perceived anti-American tone of its competition. Executives in the channel's early days instructed broadcasters to avoid the use of "loaded" terms (such as "martyr," "resistance fighters," or "occupation forces") used frequently on networks such as al-Jazeera in reporting about the U.S. military operation in Iraq, opting for terms like "armed groups" and "U.S. and coalition forces."

Alhurra is observed by Arab journalists as complying too scrupulously with embargoes on military information when Western media outlets frequently disregard these same requests. Steve Tatham, a British Royal Navy officer, recorded an instance in which a British officer briefed Arab and Western media that a humanitarian aid ship was being held back pending operations against Iraqi insurgents in the area. According to Tatham's account, when the officer asked the media to delay reporting this information for security reasons, Fox News disregarded the request whereas Alhurra complied.

Mouafac Harb, Alhurra's first news director who resigned from the organization in 2006, claimed that he left in part because he "sensed the U.S. Agency for Global Media (USAGM), formally the Broadcasting Board of Governors wanted Alhurra to promote U.S. foreign policy instead of just reporting the news." Harb claimed that at Alhurra there had been a "tendency to please Washington and not the [Arab] audience."

Allegations of anti-American bias 
Alhurra has also faced criticism from American conservative pundits who claimed that the organization had been broadcasting "anti-American" content. In 2007, conservative columnist Joel Mowbray wrote a series of harshly critical op-eds in The Wall Street Journal, claiming that Alhurra had become a "platform for terrorists." Mowbray noted that Alhurra had broadcast live, unedited speeches by Hezbollah leader Hassan Nasrallah and Hamas leader Ismail Haniyeh, an interview with an alleged al-Qaeda operative who expressed joy at the 9/11 attacks, and a panel whose members offered conspiracy theories about alleged Israeli plans to destroy the al-Aqsa Mosque in Jerusalem.

Mowbray also cited unnamed Alhurra staffers who accused news director Larry Register of "trying to pander to Arab sympathies" to make the channel more like Al Jazeera. Register – a veteran CNN producer who had been appointed as Mouafac Harb's successor with a charge to overhaul the channel's operations and increase viewership – was forced to resign as a result of the public uproar created by Mowbray's articles.

A 2008 U.S. Inspector General's office report noted that Alhurra has taken significant steps to tighten its procedures and policies in order to protect the credibility that is critical to fulfilling its mission.

Criticism of administration and oversight 
A critical 60 Minutes and ProPublica report in 2008 stated that "there appeared to be little oversight of the daily operations" of Alhurra. The report criticized Alhurra's top executives and directors for either lacking Arabic-language proficiency or possessing a media background to ensure that the broadcasts met basic journalistic standards.

A 2010 report from the U.S. Inspector General's office noted that inspectors "heard consistent reports of poor communication in the news operation." The inspector's main criticism was of the channel's news director Daniel Nassif, who was highlighted in reports of "newsroom management issues that were reported to the inspectors to have arisen during his tenure or remain unsettled from an earlier time." The hiring of several employee's relatives also led to accusations of nepotism. However, the same report also determined that MBN exercised tighter editorial controls over its programming and maintained the editorial principles for balance and comprehensiveness found in the International Broadcasting Act of 1994.

See also
 Radio Sawa
 Voice of America
 U.S. Agency for Global Media
 Al-hurra (title)

Notes

References

Further reading 
 Tatham, Steve (2006), Losing Arab Hearts & Minds: The Coalition, Al-Jazeera & Muslim Public Opinion, Hurst & Co (London), 1 January 2006, 
 Alhurra, the Free One: Assessing U.S. Satellite Television in the Middle East, Center for Contemporary Conflict, Naval Postgraduate School, November 2005

External links

  
 About Alhurra (English)
 BBG Profile

Television networks in the United States
United States government propaganda organizations
Arab mass media
Arabic-language television stations
24-hour television news channels in the United States
Television channels and stations established in 2004
International broadcasters
United States propaganda in Iraq